The Paradise Theatre was a movie palace located in Chicago's West Garfield Park neighborhood. Its address was 231 N. Crawford Avenue, Chicago, Illinois. Located near the intersection of West Madison Street and Crawford (now Pulaski Road) in the West Garfield Park area of Chicago's West Side.

History
The Paradise Theatre was built by the Balaban and Katz chain of movie theaters and opened on September 14, 1928. It was promoted as the world's most beautiful theater for its stunning interior and exterior beauty. It is regarded as one of the finest designs by architect John Eberson, as the sheer opulence and intricate craftsmanship that went into the theater made it a showpiece in and of itself. Unfortunately, flaws in the design (blamed on the vast domed ceiling in the over 3,500-seat auditorium) were exposed with the advent of talking pictures. Poor acoustics eventually cost the theater its attendance as neighborhood movie-goers would eventually turn to the nearby Mark Brothers showplace, the Marbro Theatre. As a result, business at the Paradise never recovered.

The Paradise Theatre's demise came in 1956, when Balaban and Katz closed the theater, demolished the building and sold the land to be developed as a supermarket. The theater that was "built to stand forever" almost lived up to that claim: what was estimated to have been a six-month demolition job ended up taking two years.

Organ
The Paradise Theatre was home to a large Wurlitzer theatre organ, catalog number Opus 1942. The organ console contained five manuals (keyboards), one of only three such instruments ever made by the Wurlitzer company. The organ, which had 21 ranks of pipes, was removed from the theater in 1948. It was installed in the Los Angeles home studio of Richard Vaughn, an executive at the Hi-Fi Records label. The organ was utilized by Hi-Fi to record a series of noted stereo record albums in the 1950s featuring organist George Wright. In 1969 the instrument was reinstalled in the Phoenix, Arizona home of William Brown. Brown enlarged the organ to 34 ranks. Since 2007, the organ has been in storage in Phoenix.

Styx album
Despite its financial issues, the Paradise Theatre remains a part of popular culture. Much of its notability is due to the Chicago-based rock band Styx's highly successful 1980 album Paradise Theatre.

Lead singer and keyboardist Dennis DeYoung described the concept album as a fictional account of Chicago's Paradise Theatre from its opening to closing (and eventual abandonment), serving as a metaphor for changing times in America from the late 1970s into the 1980s. The theater on the album's cover art doesn't resemble the real Paradise Theatre, appearing closer to another 1920s Chicago movie palace, the Granada Theatre.

External links
Paradise Theater, Jazz Age Chicago
Paradise Theatre at Cinema Treasures database

References

Former buildings and structures in Chicago
Demolished theatres in Illinois
Cinemas and movie theaters in Chicago
Former cinemas in the United States